Deepwater is a coastal locality in the Gladstone Region, Queensland, Australia.

Geography 
Broadwater Creek and Blackwater Creek flow through the locality merging just before entering the Coral Sea. The Broadwater Conservation Park lies between the creek and the ocean. The north of the locality is within the Deepwater National Park.

History 
The locality was named and bounded on 9 April 1999.

References 

Gladstone Region
Coastline of Queensland
Localities in Queensland